"All Your Life" is a song written by Brian and Clara Henningsen, and recorded by American country music group The Band Perry.  It was released in August 2011 as the fourth single from the band's self-titled debut album.

Content
In "All Your Life", the female narrator sings that she wants to be "the only girl you love all your life". The song is in cut time and the key of A major, with a main chord pattern of A-E-D2.

Critical reception
Billy Dukes of Taste of Country gave the song two and a half stars out of five, saying that it "sounds like a song a dozen different artists could have cut." Bobby Peacock of Roughstock gave the song four and a half stars of five, writing that the song "sets itself a little left of center with interesting imagery" and is "easily one of the most euphonious songs [he's] come across in a long time."

Music video
The music video was directed by David McClister and premiered in August 2011.

Chart performance and certifications
"All Your Life" debuted at number 52 on the U.S. Billboard Hot Country Songs chart for the week of August 13, 2011. On February 18, 2012, it became the trio's second number one single. It debuted at number 95 on the Billboard Hot 100.

Weekly charts

Year-end charts

Decade-end charts

Certifications

References

2011 singles
2011 songs
The Band Perry songs
Republic Records singles
Song recordings produced by Nathan Chapman (record producer)
Republic Nashville singles